New Taipei City Constituency XI includes districts in southeastern New Taipei City. The district was formerly known as Taipei County Constituency XI (2008-2010) and was created in 2008, when all local constituencies of the Legislative Yuan were reorganized to become single-member districts.

Current district
 Xindian
 Shenkeng
 Shiding
 Pinglin
 Wulai

Legislators

Election results

 

 
 
 
 
 
 
 

2008 establishments in Taiwan
Constituencies in New Taipei